Shadows is the fourth studio album by Australian recording artist Rachael Leahcar, released on 7 April 2017.

Leahcar said: "I write songs to connect with people and help them through each phase of life, as music has always helped me. Featuring snatches from various genres, I feel I have found my true voice, and I want to share it far and wide." "I wrote most of [the songs] on my beloved piano or guitar, and recorded the vocals at my home studio provided by Greg and Ingrid (ma and pa)."

Track listing

Charts

Release history

References

Rachael Leahcar albums
2017 albums